Caroline Emilie "Lili" Bleeker (17 January 1897 – 8 November 1985) was a Dutch entrepreneur and physicist from Middelburg known for her designs and the manufacturing of optical instruments. In the era she grew up, it was the norm for women to become housewives whose chief roles were to perform domestic duties, but Bleeker did not want to conform to these standards. She wanted to pursue an education, and never married her life-long partner, Gerard Willemse, which was quite anomalous at the time. She would later emerge as one of the first women in the Netherlands to become a doctor in physics and mathematics. After earning her PhD, she founded a physics consultancy firm, which served as an influence for the formation of TNO, and extended her firm by establishing a small factory where scientific and optical instruments were produced.

Bleeker's firm took a huge hit due to the effects of the Second World War. Sales plummeted, she had to fire some of her employees and pay the ones who remained out of her own pocket. Bleeker, along with her partner Willemse, had to go into hiding due to her actions in successfully eluding Jews from the German Officers when they invaded her factory. She re-emerged her firm after the end of the war. Because of her actions in the war, Bleeker was awarded the Royal Distinction by the Dutch army, and was later granted a recovery loan by the government to open up a new factory in Zeist. Her company manufactured the optical instruments required for the development of the phase contrast microscope, which was invented by Frits Zernike who received the Nobel prize in 1953 for this invention, and held his patents on the design.

Early life and education
Lili Bleeker was born on 17 January 1897 as the youngest of 5 children to John Lambert Bleeker, a Lutheran preacher in that city, and Martha Gerhardina Döhne, a housewife. She grew up in Middelburg and showed great brilliance as a young child, so much so that she could skip her first primary school class.  Bleeker attended Lange Sint high school in Pietersstraat, Middelburg, the Netherlands and although she was a top student, she was discouraged by her mother from furthering her studies. However, Bleeker refused because she had her sights set on her education even though girls at that time where destined to perform just domestic roles.

In 1916, she enrolled at the University of Utrecht, a large research institution located in Utrecht, Netherlands to study physics and astronomy. Bleeker became a teacher at a secondary school for girls so that she could earn money to pay for her studies, but she herself regarded that job as unsuccessful because she felt that she was too young. So, as a result, she became a private tutor. In 1919, she became a laboratory assistant to various professors at the Utrecht Observatory Sonnenborgh, and on 1 January 1926 was named as sole head assistant On 5 November 1928 she earned her PhD in physics cum laude from Utrecht University with the reputable Professor Leonard Ornstein, who was impressed by her work under his supervision that he wrote recommendation letters describing her as 'very intelligent and well educated, both theoretically and experimentally.' Bleeker's Ph.D. thesis was on measurements of emission and dispersion in the series spectra of alkali metals, and the printing office responsible for printing her thesis was owned by the father of her fellow student and life partner, Gerard Willemse.

Career 
On 5 June 1930, eighteen months after receiving her degree, Bleeker started a successful physical consultancy which advised companies and industries on scientific instruments. Her consultancy firm served as a model for the foundation of TNO in 1932. Later on, Bleeker opened a factory for the construction of scientific and optical equipment. Until 1936, the company's focus was on manufacturing hardware for the laboratory and precision electric measuring instruments. However, in 1936, Bleeker decided to start an optical workshop, and in 1937 started production on optical instruments. Her production spearheaded the optical industry in the Netherlands, which was previously nonexistent. In 1938, Bleeker entered negotiations with the Dutch military to develop binoculars for them. In 1940, The Netherlands entered World War II. Bleeker stopped production of binoculars in her factory because she did not want to produce any products for the German army. She did not stop production entirely in her factory, however. Bleeker developed microscopes for Dutch universities and their students. Bleeker also hid Jewish citizens in her factory, and eventually in 1944, someone told the German authorities about her doing so. She was able to successfully mislead the German authorities and successfully let the Jewish people in hiding escape, but Bleeker and her husband had to go into hiding. Her factory was closed down during that time. After the war, she opened a new factory, which was the first in the world to make the phase-contrast microscope invented by Frits Zernike.

Awards and honors
 There is a building at Utrecht University named after Bleeker.

References

1897 births
1985 deaths
Dutch women physicists
Utrecht University alumni
People from Middelburg, Zeeland
20th-century Dutch physicists
20th-century Dutch women scientists